Giovan Battista Fabbri (8 March 1926 – 2 June 2015) was an Italian football player and manager.

Career
Fabri managed a number of Italian club sides, including Varese, SPAL , Sangiovannese, Giulianova, Livorno, Piacenza, Vicenza, Ascoli, Cesena, Reggiana, Catania, Catanzaro, Foggia, Bologna, and Venezia.

References

1926 births
2015 deaths
Italian footballers
Serie A players
Serie B players
Serie C players
Modena F.C. players
A.C.R. Messina players
S.P.A.L. players
F.C. Pavia players
S.S.D. Varese Calcio players
Italian football managers
S.S.D. Varese Calcio managers
U.S. Livorno 1915 managers
L.R. Vicenza managers
Ascoli Calcio 1898 F.C. managers
A.C. Cesena managers
A.C. Reggiana 1919 managers
Catania S.S.D. managers
U.S. Catanzaro 1929 managers
Bologna F.C. 1909 managers
Venezia F.C. managers
Sportspeople from the Metropolitan City of Bologna
S.P.A.L. managers
Piacenza Calcio 1919 managers
Calcio Foggia 1920 managers
Association football midfielders
Footballers from Emilia-Romagna